Yuri Mikhaylovich Ahronovitch (Юрий Михайлович Аронович) (13 May 193231 October 2002) was a Soviet-born Israeli conductor.
 
Born in Leningrad, he studied music and the violin from the age of 4. In 1954 he graduated as conductor from the Leningrad Conservatory.  He studied with Nathan Rachlin and Kurt Sanderling. Invitations to conduct leading Russian orchestras followed, including the Leningrad Philharmonic and the Bolshoi Theatre.

After conducting in Petrozavodsk and Saratov, he was assigned to the Yaroslavl Symphony Orchestra 1956-1964, performing symphonic cycles by Beethoven and Tchaikovsky alongside Soviet music such as the works of Aram Khachaturian and Tikhon Khrennikov.

In 1964 he was appointed Chief Conductor of the USSR Ministry of Culture Symphony Orchestra and worked there until emigrating to Israel in 1972.

His recordings for Melodiya, notably Shostakovich's First Symphony, were well received in the West.

Immediate invitations followed to conduct and tour with major orchestras: the London Symphony Orchestra, Israel Philharmonic, Vienna Symphony Orchestra, Yomiuri Nippon Symphony Orchestra, Teatro Alla Scala and others.

From 1975 to 1986 he was Chief Conductor of the Cologne Philharmonic Orchestra (Gürzenich Orchestra Cologne) and from 1982 to 1987 Chief Conductor of the Stockholm Philharmonic Orchestra. Simultaneously Yuri Ahronovitch was also an opera conductor. He conducted at the Royal Opera House in London's Covent Garden, the Lyric Opera in Chicago, important Italian opera houses and Symphony Orchestra (Orchestra Sinfonica Siciliana), the Royal Opera in Stockholm, Cologne Opera, the Bavarian State Opera in Munich. He made a number of premiere recordings, mainly with the London Symphony, the Stockholm Philharmonic and the Vienna Symphony Orchestra.

Yuri Ahronovitch was a member of the Royal Swedish Academy of Music from 1984, and in 1987 he was decorated by the King of Sweden as "Commander of the Royal Order of the Polar Star".

In 1988 in Jerusalem he was awarded the "Ettinger Prize for the Arts". In Italy Yuri Ahronovitch was awarded the prize "Arca d'Oro 1991" by the leading Italian newspaper La Stampa and the University of Turin.  Yuri Ahronovitch conducted at numerous international music festivals, such as Bergen, Bregenz, Canary Islands, Florida, Israel, Locarno, Luzern, Munich, Savonnlina, Spoleto, Stresa, and Verona.  He conducted his last concert with the Orchestre de Paris in October 2002.

Discography
 Rachmaninov - The Piano Concertos & Paganini Rhapsody
 Shostakovich - Symphony No.1
 Khachaturian - Orchestra dell'Accademia di Santa Cecilia
 Tchaikovsky - 1812 Overture, Marche Slav, Romeo & Juliet/London Symphony Orchestra (MCA Classics); Manfred Symphony/London Symphony Orchestra (Deutsche Grammophon)

References

External links
Yuri Ahronovitch official Web site

Soviet conductors (music)
Soviet emigrants to Israel
Israeli conductors (music)
Jewish classical musicians
Musicians from Saint Petersburg
1932 births
2002 deaths
People of the Royal Stockholm Philharmonic Orchestra
20th-century conductors (music)
Deutsche Grammophon artists
Decca Records artists